West Bengal Highway Development Corporation Limited (WBHDCL) is a state agency of the  Government of West Bengal established in 2012, for development, implementation and construction of State Highways and other important roads in the state of West Bengal, India. It is under the administrative control of the Public Works Department, Government of West Bengal.

External links
Official website

References

Roads in West Bengal
State agencies of West Bengal